U.S. Route 69 (US 69) is a major north–south United States highway. The highway's southern terminus (as well as those of US 287 and US 96) is in Port Arthur, Texas at an intersection with State Highway 87. Its northern terminus is in Albert Lea, Minnesota at Minnesota State Highway 13.

Route description

Texas

US 69 begins at its southern terminus with SH 87 in Port Arthur.  This intersection is also the southern terminus for US 96 and US 287, which are concurrent with US 69.  US 69, US 96, and US 287 continue in a northwest, then west, route until its intersection with Interstate 10 in southern Beaumont. At this intersection, US 69, US 96, and US 287 merge with I-10. I-10/US 69/US 96/US 287 continue in a northerly direction through Beaumont for several miles. Just after the intersection with US 90, I-10 splits from the multiplex and resumes its easterly course, leaving US 69, US 96, and US 287 heading northwest through Beaumont. US 69 north of I-10 is also known officially known as Eastex Freeway, and is an official evacuation route, just as Interstate 69/US 59 heading north from Houston is known as Eastex Freeway as well.

In Lumberton, US 96 splits from US 69 and US 287 and heads northeast towards Jasper, while US 69 and US 287 continue on a northwest path towards Woodville.

In Woodville, US 69 splits from US 287 a few blocks north of US 190. US 287 continues northwest towards Corrigan while US 69 proceed north towards Lufkin.  In this area, between US 190 in Woodville and FM 256 in Colmesneil, US 69 is a part of the Texas Forest Trail.  Before reaching Lufkin, US 69 forms another segment of the Texas Forest Trail between SH 63 in Zavalla and FM 1818 northwest of Zavalla.

In Lufkin, US 69 is concurrent with US 59 and State Loop 287 while the route through the city is named Business US 69.  US 69, State Loop 287, and US 59 continue around the east side of Lufkin until US 59 separates at the intersection with US 59 Business northeast of Lufkin. US 69 and State Loop 287 continue until the intersection of SH 103 and Business US 69 on the northwest section of Lufkin.  At that point, US 69 is concurrent for a short distance with SH 103 and State Loop 287.  At the intersection of US 69, State Loop 287 and SH 103, US 69 departs Lufkin and heads northwest while SH 103 and State Loop 287 head south.

US 69 continues on a north to northwest path through the towns of Alto, Rusk, Jacksonville and Bullard.  Just south of Bullard, US 69 has a short concurrency with FM 2493.  US 69 continues northward into Tyler.

In Tyler, US 69 continues northward through the city until the intersection of SH 110 and SH 155, where US 69 heads west and merges with SH 110 and SH 155 through Tyler. Around seven blocks from the intersection of US 69, SH 110, and SH 155, SH 155 separates from the concurrency and travels in a southwesterly direction, leaving US 69 and SH 110 traveling in a northwesterly direction. This continues until SH 110 separates from US 69 on the northwest side of Tyler. At this intersection, SH 110 heads west while US 69 continues north.

US 69 crosses Interstate 20 at Lindale where it is signed as "Main Street".  At FM 16 in Lindale, US 69 begins its third and last segment as part of the Texas Forest Trail.  US 69 continues north to northwest to Mineola, crossing US 80 there.  Before leaving town, at its intersection with SH 37, the Texas Forest Trail turns off of US 69 to share a segment with SH 37.  US 69 takes a more northwest turn on its way through several small towns, including Emory, on its way to Greenville.  There, as it begins to enter the city, a Business route of US 69 turns off to the right to serve the downtown Greenville area, and then on to a junction with Interstate 30. At the intersection with I-30, US 69 becomes concurrent with US 380 at its terminus. The concurrency continues around the southern and western sides of Greenville until an intersection with Spur 302. At that intersection, US 380 heads west while US 69 continues north, until it reaches the northern end of its Business route, which has passed through the downtown Greenville area, then US 69 turns northwest, from Greenville to Leonard, where it encounters a brief concurrency with SH 78.

In Whitewright, SH 11 intersects and becomes concurrent with US 69 southeast of town. This continues until the intersection with SH 160, at which time SH 11 continues on a northwestward route and US 69 continues north through Whitewright.

US 69 continues north, then northwest until Denison, where it turns right to go north, at an intersection with Spur 503. US 69 goes north through downtown Denison, then at the north side of town, US 69 intersects and merges with US 75, at which time US 69 becomes concurrent with US 75. Both head northeast across the Oklahoma/Texas border at the Red River.

Oklahoma

US 69 and US 75 pass the Oklahoma border near the tiny town of Staley. They remain concurrent all the way to Atoka, where US 69 heads northeast and US 75 heads northwest. US 69 and US 75 briefly merge with SH-3 in Atoka but SH-3 remains concurrent with US 75 instead of US 69 when they split. In Stringtown, US 69 merges with SH-43. SH-43 splits from US 69 near the Atoka Reservoir and crosses it. US 69 passes right by the McAlester Ammunitions Depot. US 69 passes over Eufaula Lake 6 times. Near Muskogee, US 69 merges with US 64 and SH-2. At an intersection with US 62, US 64 heads west concurrent with US 62 while US 69 and SH-2 continue to head north. South of Pryor Creek, US 69 is the westerly boundary of the MidAmerica Industrial Park, one of the largest industrial park in the nation. Near Vinita, US 69 and SH-2 interchange with Historic Route 66 and US 60. The two highways turn east and merge with HR-66 and US 60. In Downtown Vinita, SH-2 heads north while US 69, US 60 and HR-66 head east, passing I-44 a short while later. At SH-85, the three highways make an unexpected northward turn. The three highways merge with US 59 just south of I-44. Still south of I-44, US 60 heads northeast, paralleling I-44, while HR-66, US 69, and US 59 continue heading north, passing I-44. At SH-10, US 59 heads west concurrent with SH-10, while HR-66 and US 69 head north concurrent with SH-10. In Downtown Miami, SH-10 continues heading east, while HR-66 and US 69 turn northward. South of Picher and west of Quapaw, US 69 meets US-69 Alternate. US 69 splits from HR-66 and heads north through the town of Picher.

Kansas

At the Oklahoma-Kansas state line, US 69 is joined by K-7. In Columbus, K-7 continues heading north, while US 69 turns east and merges with US 160. US 69 and US 160 meet US-69 Alternate and US 400 near Crestline, and merges with US 400. East of Cherokee, US 400 splits from the concurrency and heads west toward Cherokee. US 69 and US 160 continue heading north. North of Frontenac, US 160 splits from US 69 and heads east towards Lamar and Springfield, Missouri. US 69 continues heading north. South of Fort Scott, US 69 merges with K-7 again. In Fort Scott, US 54 merges with US 69 and K-7. The three highways continue heading north. North of town, US 54 and K-7 split from US 69 and head west; US 69 continues to head north. South of Pleasanton, US 69 merges with K-52. Northeast of Trading Point K-52 splits from US 69 and heads east. In the Kansas City suburbs, US 69 merges with I-35 and US 56/US 169. US 56, US 69, and US 169 split off from I-35 and heads east on Shawnee Mission Parkway. US 69 then heads north on Metcalf Avenue, rejoining I-35 and heading north. A short while later US 69 breaks off from I-35 and heads north on the 18th Street Expressway into Kansas City, Kansas. The highway then splits off and merges with I-70, US 24, and US 40 and heads east. At the intersection with US 169 at the 7th Street Trafficway, US 69 splits off and heads north. Just before reaching I-635, US 69 crosses into Missouri.

Missouri
US 69 enters Riverside, merges with I-635, then almost immediately exits and merges with MO-9, heading east. A half-mile later, US 69 exits from MO-9 and heads north. US-69 passes through Riverside, Northmoor, Gladstone, Claycomo, Pleasant Valley and parts of Kansas City proper before merging with I-35 for a second time, near Liberty. US 69 stays merged with I-35 for  before it exits. After exiting the highway, US 69 immediately merges with MO-33 and heads northeast. At State Route B, in rural Liberty, MO-33 heads north-northeast and US 69 continues northeast. US 69 stays somewhat parallel to I-35 as it heads through Missouri, sometimes passing under it. West of Altamont, US 69 merges with MO-6. The highways turn north and a short while later MO-6 splits from US 69 and heads west, while US 69 continues heading north. Southwest of Bethany, US 69 merges with US 136 and heads east into Bethany. In downtown Bethany, US 136 heads east, while US 69 heads north. Still paralleling I-35, US 69 passes into Iowa from Missouri  later.

Iowa

In Lamoni, US 69 makes a sharp turn toward the east. West of Leon, US 69 merges with Iowa Highway 2 (Iowa 2). In downtown Leon, US 69 heads north, while Iowa 2 heads east. East of Lake Ahquabi State Park, US 69 merges with US 65. The two highways continue to head north. At the intersection with Iowa 5, US 65 heads east concurrent Iowa 5 and US 69 continues to head north through Des Moines and Ankeny. In Ames, US 69 makes a left turn, then a right turn, and continues heading north. East of Clarion, US 69 briefly merges with Iowa 3. The two highways soon split with Iowa 3 heading east and US 69 heading north through Belmond, Iowa. Near Garner, US 69 briefly heads west concurrent with US 18, but soon splits off from it and heads north. North of Forest City, US 69 merges with Iowa 9 and continues heading north. Iowa 9 soon branches off to the west. Just south of Emmons, US 69 crosses into Minnesota.

Minnesota
US 69 enters the state at Emmons and travels north-northeast through southern Minnesota, passing through Twin Lakes. The roadway runs along the eastern shore of Pickerel Lake before entering Albert Lea, where the highway terminates at State Highway 13, formerly US 16.

History
When it was first commissioned in 1926, US 69 extended only from Leon, Iowa to Kansas City, Missouri. The part in Missouri had been Route 11 since 1922.

The route was extended north into Minnesota in 1934, mostly along what had previously been marked State Highway 13, ending at U.S. 16 in Albert Lea. At this time, it entered the state at Emmons and turned eastward along Lake Street and State Line Road, briefly re-entering Iowa to curve around the south shore of State Line Lake. In 1940, it was realigned to run north-northeast directly to Twin Lakes. The full extent of the roadway in Minnesota was paved in 1941.

Major intersections
Texas
  in Port Arthur. US 69/US 96 travels concurrently to south of Lumberton. US 69/US 287 travels concurrently to Woodville.
  in Beaumont. The highways travel concurrently through Beaumont.
  in Beaumont
  in Woodville
  in Lufkin. The highways travel concurrently through Lufkin.
  in Rusk
  in Jacksonville
  in Jacksonville
  in Lindale
  in Mineola
  in Greenville. US 69/US 380 travels concurrently through Greenville.
  in Bells
  in Denison. The highways travel concurrently to Atoka, Oklahoma.
Oklahoma
  in Durant
  on the McAlester–Krebs city line
  southwest of Checotah
  in Checotah
  in Muskogee. The highways travel concurrently through Muskogee.
  in Muskogee. The highways travel concurrently through Muskogee.
  in Chouteau
  in Big Cabin
  west-southwest of Vinita. The highways travel concurrently to northeast of Afton.
  in Vinita
  northeast of Afton. The highways travel concurrently to north of Dotyville.
  northeast of Afton
Kansas
  in Baxter Springs
  northeast of Columbus. The highways travel concurrently to Frontenac.
  north of Crestline. The highways travel concurrently to south of Pittsburg.
  in Fort Scott. The highways travel concurrently to north of Fort Scott.
  in Overland Park
  in Lenexa. I-35/US 69 travels concurrently to Merriam. US 56/US 69/US 169 travels concurrently to the Overland Park–Mission city line.
  in Mission. I-35/US 69 travels concurrently to Kansas City.
  in Kansas City.
  in Kansas City
  in Kansas City
Missouri
  in Riverside. The highways travel concurrently through Riverside.
  southeast of Northmoor
  in Gladstone
  in Kansas City
  in Claycomo
  in Pleasant Valley. The highways travel concurrently to Liberty.
  south of Cameron
  in Cameron
  southwest of Winston
  north-northwest of Altamont
  southwest of Bethany. The highways travel concurrently to Bethany.
Iowa
  on the Iowa state line south of Lamoni
  east of Lamoni
  in Osceola
  south of Indianola. The highways travel concurrently to Des Moines.
  in Des Moines
  in Des Moines
  in Ames
  south of Blairsburg
  in Garner. The highways travel concurrently to west-northwest of Garner.
Minnesota
  in Albert Lea

Special routes

Alternate route

U.S. Route 69 Alternate is a special route of U.S. Highway 69, traveling  between junctions east of Commerce, Oklahoma and north of Crestline, Kansas.

US-69 Alt., cosigned with Historic Route 66, splits from mainline US 69 south of Picher and west of Quapaw. US-69 Alt. and HR-66 head ENE through the towns of Quapaw and Baxter Springs, Kansas. North of Baxter Springs, US 400 joins the concurrency. West of Riverton, HR-66 heads east along K-66, while US-69 Alt. and US 400 head north. North of Crestline, US-69 Alt. and US 400 meet US 69 and US 160 from the west. US-69 Alt. terminates as US 69 and US 160 merge with US 400. The concurrency of US 69, US 400, and US 160 continues north.

Business loops and spurs

 Bethany, Missouri
Overland Park, Kansas
 Fort Scott, Kansas
 Arma, Kansas
 Frontenac, Kansas
 Pittsburg, Kansas
 Baxter Springs, Kansas
 Columbus, Kansas
 Miami, Oklahoma
 Durant, Oklahoma
 Vinita, Oklahoma
 Mc Alester, Oklahoma
 Checotah, Oklahoma
 Eufaula, Oklahoma
 Greenville, Texas
 Lufkin, Texas

There was also a Business U.S. 69 in Fort Scott, Kansas (about 25 minutes north of the Frontenac, Kansas area), from about 1965 to 1990. Signs from the former Business Route still exist today; however, it no longer officially exists.

See also
 U.S. Route 169

References

External links

 Endpoints of U.S. Highway 69

 
United States Numbered Highway System
U.S. Highways in Missouri
U.S. Highways in Minnesota
U.S. Highways in Iowa